Ernest Alfred Woodfield (18 August 1888 – 10 December 1974) was an Australian rules footballer who played with St Kilda in the Victorian Football League (VFL).

Notes

External links 

1888 births
1974 deaths
Australian rules footballers from Victoria (Australia)
St Kilda Football Club players